

Events

January events
 January 13 – Opening of the Milan–Venice railway's  bridge over the Venetian Lagoon between Mestre and Venice in Italy.

March events
 March 26 – John M. Forbes becomes president of the Michigan Central Railroad.

June events
 June 14 – The first Gare du Nord station in Paris, France, is opened.
 June 20 – The Paris–Lille railway is opened in France.
 June 22 – The North British Railway is opened to public traffic between Edinburgh and Berwick-upon-Tweed, the first line to cross the border between Scotland and England. Waverley Station is opened.
 June 26 – The Great Northern Railway (Great Britain) is authorised by Act of Parliament with powers to construct a direct line from London to York with a loop via Boston,  with a capital of £5,600,000, the largest single scheme ever approved by Parliament.

July events
 July 1 – The Leeds and Bradford Railway opens between Leeds and Bradford, West Yorkshire, England.
 July 15 – The first railway line in Hungary opens between Pest and Vác.
 July 16 – The London and North Western Railway is formed in England by amalgamation of the London and Birmingham Railway, Grand Junction Railway and Manchester and Birmingham Railway.

August events
 August 11 – First section of Furness Railway in England opens to mineral traffic; passengers are first carried on December 1.
 August 18 – Gauge Act passed by the Parliament of the United Kingdom rules that new railways in Great Britain should be built to standard gauge and 5 ft 3 inches in Ireland unless otherwise authorised.
 August 28 – Railway Mania reaches its zenith as the Parliament of the United Kingdom closes its session having passed 272 Acts setting up new railway companies.

September events
 September 21 – The town of Kendal, England, declares a public holiday for the opening of the Kendal, Oxenholme and Lancaster section of the Lancaster and Carlisle Railway; the first revenue trains are operated on September 22.
 September 28 – The East Lancashire Railway opens to the public from Clifton Junction to Rawtenstall in England.

November events
 November 10 – Portland Company established by John A. Poor and Septimus Norris of the Norris Locomotive Works.

December events
 December 17 – The Lancaster and Carlisle Railway is opened throughout to Carlisle.

Births

April births
 April 13 – Lucius E. Johnson, president of the Norfolk and Western Railroad 1904–1921 (d. 1921).

October births
 October 6 – George Westinghouse, American inventor; developed the Westinghouse air brake (d. 1914).

References